High-definition television in Singapore is already in "stage conversion".

Although many households in Singapore own HD ready or Full HD television sets some of them are still broadcast in SDTV. However, these were in stage conversion with the digital television.

Trial
On 22 December 2006, HDTV trials based in Singapore began. Two Singaporean broadcasters were involved, MediaCorp (broadcasting HD in DVB-T) and StarHub Cable Vision (DVB-C). Both broadcast in 1080i, but at 50 Hz, in line with the traditional PAL frequency Singapore uses. Triallists were selected from applicants who had applied prior to 1 January 2007 and there are a total of 1,000 participants in the trial. These trials closed at the end of 31 December 2007.

Services

Mediacorp

StarHub TV
StarHub TV is a Singapore cable television provider currently airs more than 30 HD channels.

Singtel TV
Singtel TV is a Singapore IPTV service.

Notes

References

Singapore
Science and technology in Singapore
Television in Singapore
Digital television in Singapore